Carl Bender may refer to:

 Carl M. Bender (born 1943), American professor of physics
 Carl Jacob Bender, missionary pioneer to Cameroon